Balte is a village in the municipality of Čelinac, Republika Srpska, Bosnia and Herzegovina.

According to the 1991 census, the population was 236, of whom 234 called themselves Serbs.

References

Villages in Republika Srpska
Populated places in Čelinac